Trond Halvorsen Wirstad (15 June 1904 – 4 October 1985) was a Norwegian politician for the Centre Party.

He was elected to the Norwegian Parliament from Oppland in 1950, and was re-elected on four occasions.

Wirstad was born in Lunner and was mayor of Lunner municipality in the period 1947–1951.

References

1904 births
1985 deaths
Members of the Storting
Centre Party (Norway) politicians
20th-century Norwegian politicians
People from Lunner